Myophiomyinae is an extinct subfamily of rodent.

References

 Lavocat, R. 1973. Les rongeurs du Miocčne d’Afrique Orientale. Memoires et travaux Ecole Pratique des Hautes Etudes, Institut Montpellier, 1:1-284.

Myophiomyidae
Mammal subfamilies